আবার (Again) is the third studio album by Bangladeshi rock band Black, released on July 10, 2008. After a full five-year hiatus the band released the album under the sponsorship of Warid Telecom. A gala was held for the album's release at Dhaka's Bashundhara City shopping mall, with the band performing various songs from the album with collaborations from other notable artists. The album was said to have sold 5,000 copies three hours after launch and is considered to be Black's most critically acclaimed album and a landmark record for the rock music scene of Bangladesh.

Track listing

Production team
 Recorded By: Shuvo, Saad & Iqbal Asif Jewel
 Recorded At: BENGAL MUSIC STUDIO & NOT OF THIS EARTH
 Mixed & Mastered By: Iqbal Asif Jewel
 Photography: Khademul Insan

Line up
 Jon – vocals, guitar
 Jahan – lead guitar
 Sagar – bass
 Tony – drums

Guest musicians
 Gary Kanter: Trumpet (Track 4)
 Iqbal Asif Jewel: Key & Effects (Track 1, 3, 4, 8 & 9), Bass & Guitar Solo (Track 3), Guitar Interlude (Track 8)

References

2008 albums
Black (Bangladeshi band) albums